Niso  is a genus of very small parasitic sea snails, marine gastropod mollusks or micromollusks in the family Eulimidae.

Species
According to the World Register of Marine Species (WoRMS) the following species with accepted names are included within the genus Niso 

 † Niso acarinatoconica Sacco, 1892 
 Niso aeglees Bush, 1885
 Niso albida Dall, 1889
 Niso alfredensis Bartsch, 1915
 Niso attilioi (Hertz & Hertz, 1982)
 Niso balteata G. B. Sowerby III, 1900
 † Niso basiglobosa Marwick, 1942 
 Niso baueri Emerson, 1965
 Niso brunnea (G. B. Sowerby I, 1834)
 Niso candidula A. Adams, 1854
 Niso chevreuxi Dautzenberg, 1891
 Niso circinata Dall, 1889
 † Niso degrangei Cossmann & Peyrot, 1917
 Niso dorcas Kuroda & Habe, 1950
 † Niso eburnea Risso, 1826 
 Niso emersoni McLean, 1970
 Niso excolpa Bartsch, 1917
 Niso foresti Bouchet & Warén, 1986
 Niso goniostoma A. Adams, 1854
 Niso hendersoni Bartsch, 1953
 Niso hizensis Kuroda & Habe, 1950
 Niso imbricata (Sowerby I, 1834)
 Niso interrupta (G. B. Sowerby I, 1834)
 Niso lomana Bartsch, 1917
 Niso marmorata (G. B. Sowerby I, 1834)
 Niso matsumotoi Kuroda & Habe, 1961
 Niso microforis Dall, 1927
 Niso nakayasui Habe, 1976
 † Niso neozelanica Suter, 1917 
 Niso portoricensis Dall & Simpson, 1901
 Niso pura (Melvill & Standen, 1901)
 † Niso putata Finlay & Marwick, 1937 
 Niso pyramidelloides Nevill, 1871
 Niso regia Kuroda & Habe, 1950
 Niso richardi Dautzenberg & Fischer, 1897
 Niso rubrapicata Habe, 1976
 Niso smithi Schepman, 1909
 Niso splendidula (G. B. Sowerby I, 1834)
 Niso stenomphala Kuroda & Habe, 1950
 Niso sumatrana Thiele, 1925
 † Niso terebellata (Lamarck, 1804) 
 Niso terebellum (Dillwyn, 1817)
 Niso tetuakii Habe, 1949
 Niso tricolor Dall, 1889
 Niso trilineata Mörch, 1872
 Niso venosa Sowerby III, 1895
 Niso yokoyamai Kuroda & Habe, 1950

Species brought into synonymy
 Niso babylonica (Bartsch, 1912): synonym of Niso rangi (de Folin, 1867)
 Niso hipolitensis Bartsch, 1917: synonym of Subniso hipolitensis (Bartsch, 1917) (original combination)
 Niso joubini Dautzenberg & Fischer H., 1897: synonym of Costaclis mizon (Watson, 1881)
 Niso mucronetincta Thiele, 1925 : synonym of Thaleia mucronetincta (Thiele, 1925)
 Niso quadrasi Boettger, 1893: synonym of Stilifer variabilis O. Boettger, 1893
 Niso rangi (de Folin, 1867): synonym of Subniso rangi (de Folin, 1867)
 Niso rubropicta [sic]: synonym of Niso rubrapicata Habe, 1976 (misspelling)
 Niso sandwichensis [sic]: synonym of Apicalia sandvichensis (G.B. Sowerby II, 1865)

References

 Warén A. (1984) A generic revision of the family Eulimidae (Gastropoda, Prosobranchia). Journal of Molluscan Studies suppl. 13: 1-96. page(s): 59
 Gofas, S.; Le Renard, J.; Bouchet, P. (2001). Mollusca, in: Costello, M.J. et al. (Ed.) (2001). European register of marine species: a check-list of the marine species in Europe and a bibliography of guides to their identification. Collection Patrimoines Naturels, 50: pp. 180–213

Eulimidae